The Old Rectory in Epworth, Lincolnshire is a Queen Anne style building, rebuilt after a fire in 1709, which has been completely restored and is now the property of the British Methodist Church, who maintain it as a museum. It is the site of supposed paranormal events that occurred in 1716, while the Wesley family was living in the house. The rectory was home to the Reverend Samuel Wesley, his wife Susanna and their 19 children, one of whom, John Wesley, grew up to become a founder of the Methodist Church.

The Old Rectory is managed by a board of trustees appointed by the British Methodist Conference and the World Methodist Council. The current chair of trustees (2015) is the Rev. Graham Carter, a past President of the Methodist Conference.

Epworth Rectory haunting

The Epworth Rectory haunting also known as the "Wesley poltergeist" is one of the best-known English poltergeist claims. From December 1716 until January 1717, it is said to have been plagued by a series of regularly occurring mysterious loud noises and knockings, claimed to be caused by a ghost that Wesley's fourth eldest daughter  Hetty nicknamed "Old Jeffrey", who is said to have made his presence known to all on Christmas Day 1716. In Mrs. Wesley's words, "there was such a noise in the room over our heads, as if several people were walking, then running up and down stairs that we thought the children would be frightened". According to the tale, as she and her husband searched the house in vain for the culprit, Old Jeffrey continued "rattling and thundering in every room, and even blowing an invisible horn at deafening decibels". "Old Jeffrey" supposedly disappeared in January 1717 just as suddenly as he had appeared.

Addington Bruce (1908) noted that the earliest records that document the haunting have large discrepancies from later reports. According to Bruce the original records from the 18th century reduce the "haunting" to nothing more than some alleged creaking noises, knocks, footsteps or groaning sounds. Bruce commented that "we are, therefore, justified in believing that in this case, like so many others of its kind, the fallibility of human memory has played an overwhelming part in exaggerating the experiences actually undergone." He suggested that Hetty had produced the phenomena fraudulently.

Trevor H. Hall in his book New Light on Old Ghosts (1965) also provided naturalistic explanations for the phenomena at the Rectory.

See also

Cock Lane ghost
Drummer of Tedworth

References

Citations

Bibliography

Bruce, Addington (1908). Historic Ghosts and Ghost Hunters. New York: Moffat, Yard & Company.

External links
The Epworth Rectory haunting

Historic house museums in Lincolnshire
History of Methodism
Methodism in England
Religious museums in England
Reportedly haunted locations in East Midlands
Epworth, Lincolnshire